The 2009–10 CAA men's basketball season marks the 25th season of Colonial Athletic Association basketball. The conference is doing numerous "Silver Anniversary" programs and highlights throughout the season.

Preseason
On September 23, 2009 the Colonial Athletic Association announced that all 12 CAA teams had been named to ESPN's BracketBusters, which is set for February 19–20, 2010. Home games will be played by Delaware, George Mason, Georgia State, Hofstra, Northeastern and Virginia Commonwealth (VCU). Drexel, James Madison, UNC Wilmington, Old Dominion, Towson and William & Mary are all road teams.

CAA Media Day
On October 20, 2009 the Colonial Athletic Association held their annual Media Day at the ESPN Zone in Washington, D.C. The results of a vote of the league's coaches, sports information directors and media was announced to unveil the predicted order of finish for the CAA teams in the conference as well as the preseason all-conference teams.

2009–10 Preseason All-CAA Team

CAA Preseason Co-Players of the Year Charles Jenkins (Hofstra) and Gerald Lee (Old Dominion)
Honorable Mention Ben Finney, Jr., G/F, Old Dominion; Jawan Carter, Jr., G, Delaware; Chaisson Allen, Jr., G, Northeastern

CAA Preseason Poll

1. Old Dominion 
2. Northeastern 
3. VCU 
4. George Mason 
5. James Madison 
6. Hofstra 

7. Drexel 
8. Georgia State 
9. Towson 
10. William and Mary 
11. Delaware 
12. UNC Wilmington

Notable upsets

References